Curaçao Express was a regional airline based in Bonaire, Netherlands Antilles. It operated services between the islands of the Netherlands Antilles, mostly flights between Curaçao and Sint Maarten.

History
The airline started operations on October 4, 2004 with one ATR 42-500 and was formerly known as CuraçaoExel and later became Curaçao Express. It was wholly owned by Bonaire Participation. The airline was planned to expand with new aircraft types and destinations in the United States and South America. The airline merged with Bonair Express to form Dutch Antilles Express, which operated until it ceased operations in 2013.

Destinations
Curaçao Express operated the following services (in January 2005):

Fleet
The CuracaoExel/Curaçao Express fleet consisted of the following aircraft (at January 2005):

See also
Bonair Express
List of defunct airlines of the Netherlands Antilles

References

Defunct airlines of the Netherlands Antilles
Defunct airlines of Bonaire
Airlines established in 2004
Airlines disestablished in 2005
2004 establishments in the Netherlands Antilles
2005 disestablishments in the Netherlands Antilles